Michael Sean Person (born May 17, 1988) is a former American football guard. He was drafted by the San Francisco 49ers in the seventh round of the 2011 NFL Draft. He played college football at Montana State.

Person has also been a member of the Indianapolis Colts, Seattle Seahawks, St. Louis Rams, Atlanta Falcons, Kansas City Chiefs.

Early years
Person was two-time offensive lineman of the year in high school. He was named team MVP for Dawson County High School during his senior year.

College career
He was selected as an honorable mention all-conference team in 2010.

Professional career

San Francisco 49ers
Person was drafted by the San Francisco 49ers in the seventh round of the 2011 NFL Draft. He was released by the 49ers on August 31, 2012.

Indianapolis Colts
Person was claimed off waivers by the Indianapolis Colts on September 1, 2012. The Colts waived Person on September 10, 2012.

Seattle Seahawks
Person was added to the Seattle Seahawks practice squad on September 13, 2012. He was promoted to the active roster on October 30, 2012. Person was released by the Seahawks on September 14, 2013.

St. Louis Rams
Person was claimed off waivers by the St. Louis Rams on September 17, 2013.

Atlanta Falcons
Person signed with the Falcons on March 10, 2015. He was released by the Falcons on October 25, 2016.

Kansas City Chiefs
On November 2, 2016, Person was signed by the Kansas City Chiefs. On March 10, 2017, Person re-signed with the Chiefs. He was released on September 2, 2017.

Indianapolis Colts (second stint)
On October 3, 2017, Person signed with the Colts. He played in 12 games and started four games at center after Ryan Kelly suffered an injury.

San Francisco 49ers (second stint)
On May 9, 2018, Person signed with the San Francisco 49ers. He was named the 49ers starting right guard, starting in all 16 games.

On March 3, 2019, Person signed a three-year, $9 million contract extension with the 49ers. In 2019, the 49ers reached Super Bowl LIV, but lost 31-20 to the Kansas City Chiefs.

On April 1, 2020, Person was released by the 49ers. Person announced his retirement on June 28, 2020.

Coaching career
In 2022 Person joined Mike McDaniel’s inaugural Dolphins staff as an offensive assistant.

References

External links
Montana State Bobcats bio
Atlanta Falcons bio

1988 births
Living people
American football offensive guards
Montana State Bobcats football players
People from Glendive, Montana
Players of American football from Montana
San Francisco 49ers players
Indianapolis Colts players
Seattle Seahawks players
St. Louis Rams players
Atlanta Falcons players
Kansas City Chiefs players
Miami Dolphins coaches